The 1999 SEAT Open was a women's tennis tournament played on indoor carpet courts in Kockelscheuer, Luxembourg which was part of Tier III of the 1999 WTA Tour. It was the ninth edition of the tournament and was held from 20 September until 27 September 1999. Qualifier Kim Clijsters won the singles title and earned $27,000 first-prize money.

Entrants

Seeds

Other entrants
The following players received wildcards into the singles main draw:
  Justine Henin
  Miriam Oremans
  Lina Krasnoroutskaya

The following players received wildcards into the doubles main draw:
  Claudine Schaul /  Fabienne Thill

The following players received entry from the singles qualifying draw:

  Kim Clijsters
  Jelena Kostanić
  Magdalena Maleeva
  Tina Pisnik

The following players received entry as lucky losers:

  Els Callens

Finals

Singles

 Kim Clijsters defeated  Dominique Van Roost, 6–2, 6–2
 This was Clijsters' first singles title of her career.

Doubles

 Irina Spîrlea /  Caroline Vis defeated  Tina Križan /  Katarina Srebotnik, 6–1, 6–2

References

External links
 ITF tournament edition details
 Tournament draws

SEAT Luxembourg Open
Luxembourg Open
1999 in Luxembourgian tennis